This is a list of the military equipment of the Royal Navy and other British naval forces of World War II. This list shows the equipment for British naval and naval aviation forces like naval artillery on board British ships and boats as well as  the weapons used by British naval forces such as torpedoes and naval mines.

Naval artillery

Battleship and monitor main armament 

BL 14-inch Mk VII
 BL 15-inch Mk I
 BL 16-inch Mk I

Heavy cruiser main armament 
BL 7.5-inch Mk VI
 BL 8-inch Mk VIII

Light cruiser main armament and battleship and heavy cruiser secondary armament 

 QF 4-inch Mk V
QF 5.25-inch Mk I dual purpose gun, used on King George V-class battleships  and Dido-class cruisers
BL 6-inch Mk XII
BL 6-inch Mk XXII
BL 6-inch Mk XXIII

Small ship main armament 
 
British made 
QF 6-pounder 10 cwt
QF 12-pounder 12 cwt
QF 4 inch Mk IV
BL 4-inch Mk IX
QF 4-inch Mk XVI
QF 4-inch Mk XIX
QF 4.5-inch Mk I – V
BL 4.7-inch Mk I and Mk II
QF 4.7-inch Mk IX & XII naval gun
QF 4.7-inch Mk XI naval gun
US naval artillery obtained by Lend-Lease and destroyers for bases agreement
 3-inch/50 calibre gun
4-inch/50 calibre gun

Submarine armament 
 QF 4-inch naval gun Mk XII and Mk XXII

Armed boats armament 

 QF 3-pounder Hotchkiss
QF 6-pdr Class M Mark I with Auto Loader Mk III

Anti-aircraft guns

Machine guns 

 Lewis gun
 Vickers .50 machine gun

Autocannons 

 QF 2-pounder Mk I and Mk VIII
 Oerlikon 20 mm cannon - licensed production of Swiss design
 Bofors 40 mm gun license production of Swedish design

Anti-aircraft artillery 
British made
QF 3-inch 20 cwt
 QF 4.7-inch Mk VIII naval gun

US made obtained through Destroyers-for-bases deal

 3-inch/23 calibre

Other 

Holman Projector
Unrotated Projectile

Torpedoes 

 18-inch torpedoes Mk VIII-XVII
21-inch torpedo Mk II-XI
24.5-inch torpedo - fitted to Nelson-class battleships only

Naval mines 

 Mark XVII contact naval mine

Anti-submarine weapons

Depth charges 

Mark VII depth charge
Mark VII Heavy
Mark VII Airborne DC
Mark VIII Airborne DC
Mark X, X* 
Mark XI Airborne DC

Anti-submarine projectile launchers 
Hedgehog - multiple spigot mortar
Squid - three barrelled 12-inch anti-submarine mortar

Naval radar 

See List of World War II British naval radar

Boilers 

 Admiralty 3-drum boiler

Small arms 

Lanchester submachine gun - 9mm Parabellum

Notes

References
Campbell, John (1985). Naval Weapons of World War II. Annapolis, Maryland: Naval Institute Press. .

 Naval
United Kingdom,Naval
Naval forces military equipment
Naval forces military equipment
Naval forces military equipment